Eino Rudolf  Woldemar Holsti (8 October 1881 in Jyväskylä – 3 August 1945 in Palo Alto, California) was a Finnish politician, journalist and diplomat. He was the Minister of Foreign Affairs in 1919–1922 and in 1936–1938 and a member of the Finnish Parliament in 1913–1918 representing the Young Finnish Party (Nuorsuomalainen Puolue).

Biography
From 1919 he represented the National Progressive Party. Holsti represented Finland in the League of Nations. He was also a republican (opposing the then ongoing movement for monarchy in Finland). A firm supporter of democracy, he openly criticized Adolf Hitler at the outbreak of war. He held a pro-British political stance. Holsti worked for newspapers in Hämeenlinna, Lahti and Helsinki together with his friend and school companion Joel Lehtonen. The friendship ended abruptly when Holsti recognized himself as the satirically portrayed and fictive politician Rolf Idell in Lehtonen's book Sorron lapset (1924). Holsti was also Envoy to Estonia from 1923 to 1927.

Later in life, Holsti taught at Stanford University, after he moved to United States with his two sons: Kalevi and Olavi Holsti (both respected political scientists in their own right). He maintained a healthy correspondence with president Herbert Hoover, and the prime minister and president of Finland. He died on 3 August 1945 at Palo Alto Hospital while undergoing surgery to repair a hernia. His wife Liisa died of tuberculosis on 22 July 1951.

Honorary degrees
Temple University, Philadelphia, USA (PhD. h.c) in 1938

References

Citations

Bibliography 
 Pietiäinen, Jukka-Pekka; Rudolf Holsti, Lehtimies, tiedemies, poliitikko 1881- 1919, Weilin+Göös 1986 .

External links
 

1881 births
1945 deaths
People from Jyväskylä
People from Vaasa Province (Grand Duchy of Finland)
Young Finnish Party politicians
National Progressive Party (Finland) politicians
Finnish senators
Ministers for Foreign Affairs of Finland
Members of the Parliament of Finland (1913–16)
Members of the Parliament of Finland (1916–17)
Members of the Parliament of Finland (1917–19)
Members of the Parliament of Finland (1922–24)
Permanent Representatives of Finland to the League of Nations
University of Helsinki alumni
Stanford University faculty
Recipients of the Order of the White Star, 1st Class
Finnish expatriates in the United States